Brian Freeman (born March 28, 1963) is an author of psychological suspense novels featuring Jonathan Stride and Serena Dial, and series featuring Cab Bolton and Frost Easton. He has also written novels in the Jason Bourne series after Robert Ludlum and Eric Van Lustbader.

In April 2021, Freeman sold the rights to his novel, “Infinite” to Universal Pictures.

Biography
Brian Freeman was born in Chicago, Illinois. He attended Carleton College where he graduated in 1984 with magna cum laude in English. Before becoming an author, Brian Freeman was a director of marketing and public relations at the international law firm of Faegre & Benson. He debuted in 2005 with his novel, Immoral, which won the Macavity Award for Best First Novel and was a finalist for the Edgar Award. His books have been sold in 46 countries and are available in 17 languages. He credits his grandmother and his 8th grade composition teacher for his success.

Novels

References

External links
Brian Freeman's Official Website
Brian Freeman's Facebook Page
Fantastic Fiction website on Brian Freeman
Story Behind The Cold Nowhere - Online Essay by Brian Freeman at Upcoming4.me
The story behind Season of Fear - Online Essay by Brian Freeman at Upcoming4.me
ScriptsandScribes.com Interview with author Brian Freeman

1963 births
Living people
American thriller writers
American mystery writers
21st-century American novelists
Writers from Chicago
Carleton College alumni
Macavity Award winners
American male novelists
21st-century American male writers
Novelists from Illinois